Holiday Shores is an unincorporated community and census-designated place (CDP) in Madison County, Illinois, United States. Its population was 2,840 as of the 2020 census.

Geography
Holiday Shores is in northern Madison County and consists of housing surrounding Holiday Lake, a reservoir on Joulters Creek. The lake outlet is a quarter mile north of Paddock Creek, a south-flowing tributary of Cahokia Creek, which continues southwest to the Mississippi River near Hartford.

References

Census-designated places in Madison County, Illinois
Census-designated places in Illinois